Atvars Tribuncovs (born October 14, 1976) is a professional ice hockey player. He competed for Latvia at the 2002 and 2006 Winter Olympics. Tribuncovs is currently playing for Arystan Temirtau in the Kazakhstan Hockey Championship league.

Career statistics

Regular season and playoffs

International

External links
 
 
 
 

1976 births
Living people
Arystan Temirtau players
Berlin Capitals players
Dinamo Riga players
Expatriate ice hockey players in Russia
Färjestad BK players
HC Lada Togliatti players
HC Spartak Moscow players
HK Zemgale players
Ice hockey players at the 2002 Winter Olympics
Ice hockey players at the 2006 Winter Olympics
Latvian ice hockey defencemen
Lukko players
Modo Hockey players
Mora IK players
Olympic ice hockey players of Latvia
Oulun Kärpät players
People from Ogre, Latvia
Salavat Yulaev Ufa players
Tallahassee Tiger Sharks players
Podhale Nowy Targ players
Latvian expatriate sportspeople in the United States